Thomas Bartlett (born October 13, 1981), also known as Doveman, is an American pianist, producer, and singer. He has released four solo albums as Doveman, four albums as a member of The Gloaming, duo albums with the composer Nico Muhly and the hardanger d’amore player Caoimhín Ó Raghallaigh, and "Shelter," an album of solo piano compositions.

As a producer, Bartlett has worked with a range of notable artists, including Yoko Ono, St. Vincent, Norah Jones, and many others. "Mystery of Love", a collaboration with Sufjan Stevens for the soundtrack to Call Me by Your Name, was nominated for an Academy Award for Best Original Song, and a Grammy Award for Best Song Written for Visual Media at the 61st ceremony. Bebel Gilberto's "Agora," produced, engineered and mixed by Bartlett, was nominated for Best Global Music Album at the 2021 Grammys, and he also contributed to Taylor Swift's "evermore", and Rufus Wainwright's "Unfollow the Rules", both nominated that year. Since 2018, Bartlett has worked closely with Florence and the Machine, and in April 2021 it was announced that Florence and Bartlett were co-writing a Broadway-bound musical based on "The Great Gatsby."

Early life and education
Bartlett grew up in Putney, Vermont, where he started piano lessons as a young child. Bartlett and his childhood friend Sam Amidon, along with Amidon's younger brother Stefan, formed a contra dance band called Popcorn Behavior. They released three recordings, the first when Amidon and Bartlett were 13 years old. Bartlett played piano and composed some of the songs on the recordings. Amidon and Bartlett were interviewed about their music on the National Public Radio program All Things Considered in 1998.

As a child Bartlett was drawn to Irish traditional music, particularly as performed by the fiddler Martin Hayes, whose first album appeared in 1992. On a visit to Ireland with his parents when he was 12 Bartlett attended several of Hayes's concerts and met Hayes. On returning home Bartlett arranged for Hayes to play a concert in Vermont.

After graduation from high school Bartlett spent a year in London studying piano with Maria Curcio. He moved to New York and enrolled at Columbia University to study English. After three semesters he left university to become a professional musician.

Musical career 

Thomas Bartlett's musical career has emphasized collaboration, both as performer and producer.

While a student at Columbia, Bartlett became friends with Nico Muhly. They have continued to work together on a project called Peter Pears, after the English tenor who was Benjamin Britten's life partner. In 2018 they released an album entitled Balinese Ceremonial Music inspired by the Canadian composer Colin McPhee's gamelan transcriptions.

An early appearance playing piano for Chocolate Genius at Joe's Pub in New York introduced him to a number of musicians with whom he would later perform, as well as to his future producer Patrick Dillett. Among the singers he accompanied early in his career were David Byrne, Laurie Anderson, Yoko Ono, Anohni, and Martha Wainwright.

Bartlett used the name Doveman for his own live performances as a vocalist with a band and on three recordings made between 2005 and 2009. According to Bartlett, Doveman "has always been me and whoever I have along for that night", rather than "an organism that is a band".

Bartlett devoted himself increasingly to being a record producer rather than a sideman, stating in 2014 that collaboration "is what I enjoy the most" and that "producing records is where I'm the happiest and where I think my talents are best used".

In January 2011, Bartlett, as Doveman, began a monthly salon style performance series at the West Village club (Le) Poisson Rouge, called the Burgundy Stain Sessions, inviting friends to join him and the band on stage. Over the course of the year, performers included Norah Jones, Glen Hansard, Rufus Wainwright, Martha Wainwright, Sara Quin, Beth Orton, Sam Amidon, Nico Muhly, Elysian Fields, Chocolate Genius, Julia Stone, Chris Thile, The Ghost of a Saber Tooth Tiger, Lisa Hannigan, and St. Vincent.

In October 2011 Bartlett music-directed, and co-curated with Hansard, two shows at (Le) Poisson Rouge celebrating the 10th anniversary of Other Voices, a live music series broadcast on Irish television. Performers included Laurie Anderson, Damien Rice, Bell X1 (band), The Lost Brothers, Bryce Dessner and Aaron Dessner, Gabriel Byrne, Paul Muldoon, Colum McCann, and others.

With fiddle player Martin Hayes, guitarist Dennis Cahill, vocalist Iarla Ó Lionáird, and hardanger fiddle player Caoimhín Ó Raghallaigh, Bartlett is a member of The Gloaming. They have released four albums, all produced by Bartlett.

In 2019 Bartlett and fellow Gloaming member Caoimhín Ó Raghallaigh released a collaborative studio album entitled Caoimhín Ó Raghallaigh and Thomas Bartlett.

Discography

As producer

References

External links

 Artist Management
Doveman on Brassland Records
 

Musicians from Vermont
1981 births
Living people
Pupils of Maria Curcio
The Gloaming members
Antony and the Johnsons members
21st-century American keyboardists